Jeu de cartes may refer to

A musical composition by Igor Stravinsky from 1936, and also either of two ballets to Stravinsky's music: 

 Jeu de cartes (Balanchine) (1937), made by George Balanchine on his American Ballet and danced fourteen years later by New York City Ballet
 Jeu de cartes (Martins) (1992), by Peter Martins for New York City Ballet